Fool's literature was a literary tradition in medieval Europe in which the stock character of a fool was used as an allegory to satirize the contemporary society.

Notable examples
  (1410, The Ring), a satirical poem by Heinrich Wittenwiler
 Daß Narrenschyff ad Narragoniam (1494; Ship of Fools), a poem by the German satirist Sebastian Brant
Moriae Encomium, sive Stultitiae Laus (1509, The Praise of Folly), by Erasmus of Rotterdam
Narrenbeschwörung (1512; Exorcism of Fools), Die Schelmenzunft (1512); Die Gäuchmatt (1519, Fools' Meadow), Die Mühle von Schwindelsheim und Gretmüllerin Jahrzeit by Thomas Murner

See also
Picaresque novel
Maqama
Sotie

References

Literary genres
Medieval literature
Satirical works
Fictional characters by role in the narrative structure